Choi may refer to:

 Choi (Korean surname), a Korean surname
 Choi, Macau Cantonese transliteration of the Chinese surname Cui (崔) and Xu (徐)
 Choi, Cantonese romanisation of Cai (surname) (蔡), a Chinese surname
 CHOI-FM, a radio station in Quebec City, Canada
 Choi Bounge, a character from the King of Fighters video game series
Children's Hospital of Illinois

See also 
 Choy (disambiguation)